Hubert Mingarelli (14 January 1956 – 26 January 2020) was a French writer. He was born in Mont-Saint-Martin in Lorraine. After serving in the navy for three years, he settled in the southern city of Grenoble. He won the Prix Medici in 2003 for his novel Quatre Soldats (Four Soldiers). The English translation of his novel Un repas en hiver (A Meal in Winter) by Sam Taylor was nominated for the Independent Foreign Fiction Prize.

He died on 26 January 2020 from cancer.

Bibliography
 Le Secret du funambule, Milan, coll. Zanzibar, 1990 
 Le Bruit du vent, Gallimard Page blanche, 1991 ; nouv. édition en Page blanche, 1998 ; Folio junior, 2003 puis 2013
 La Lumière volée, Gallimard Page blanche, 1993 ; nouv. édition en Page Blanche, 1999 ; Folio junior, 2009 puis 2012
 Le Jour de la cavalerie, Le Seuil, 1995 ; Points Seuil, 2003
 L'Arbre, Le Seuil, 1996.
 Vie de sable, Le Seuil,1998.
 Une rivière verte et silencieuse, Le Seuil, 1999 ; Points Seuil, 2001
 La Dernière Neige, Le Seuil, 2000 . Points Seuil, 2002
 La Beauté des loutres, Le Seuil, 2002 ; Points Seuil, 2004
 Quatre Soldats, Le Seuil, 2003. (Prix Médicis) ; Points Seuil, 2004
 Hommes sans mère, Le Seuil, 2004 ; Points Seuil, 2005
 Le Voyage d'Eladio", Le Seuil, 2005.
 Océan Pacifique, Le Seuil, 2006.
 Marcher sur la rivière, Le Seuil, 2007.
 La Promesse, Le Seuil, 2009.
 L'Année du soulèvement, Le Seuil, 2010.
 La lettre de Buenos Aires, Buchet-Chastel, 2011
 La Source, Cadex, 2012
 Un repas en hiver, Stock, 2012
 L’homme qui avait soif, Stock, 2014
 L’Incendie, avec Antoine Choplin, Éditions La Fosse aux ours, 2015
 La route de Beit Zera, Stock, 2015 ; Points Seuil, 2016
 Une histoire de tempête, Éditions du sonneur, 2015
 La Terre invisible, Buchet-Chastel, 2019

Translations
 A Meal in Winter (Un repas en hiver), translated by Sam Taylor (2012) Portobello Books 
 Four Soldiers (Quatre Soldats), translated by Sam Taylor (2018) Portobello Books, 
 The Invisible Land  (La Terre invisible''), translated by Sam Taylor (2021) Granta, ISBN 9781783786022

References 

1956 births
2020 deaths
French male writers
People from Meurthe-et-Moselle
Prix Médicis winners
Prix Louis Guilloux winners